Pat E. Johnson (born in 1939) is a 9th degree black belt in the  art of American Tang Soo Do. He is the president of the National Tang Soo Do Congress, which was originally created by Chuck Norris in 1973. Johnson is famous for the martial arts choreography in the Karate Kid series in which he also starred as the All Valley Karate Tournament head referee, and has been involved in many films, as choreographer and actor including Enter the Dragon, Teenage Mutant Ninja Turtles, Mortal Kombat, Green Street Hooligans, and Punisher: War Zone. He is the 1995 Black Belt Magazine Instructor of the Year.

Biography
Johnson was born in 1939 in Niagara Falls, New York. He began training in traditional Korean Tang Soo Do Moo Duk Kwan in 1963, while stationed in South Korea as a chaplain in the U.S. Army. While under the tutelage of a Korean master named Kang Lo Hee, Johnson earned his black belt in just thirteen months. After his army service ended, Johnson met and formed an association with Tang Soo Do instructor Chuck Norris. Johnson soon rose to the rank of chief instructor at Norris' school in Sherman Oaks, California in 1968. That same year, he formulated the penalty-point system still used by karate tournaments.

From 1968 to 1973, Johnson was captain of the undefeated Chuck Norris black belt competition team, which won 33 consecutive national and international titles. In 1971, he became the National Tang Soo Do Champion. In both 1975 and 1976, Johnson was awarded the prestigious Golden Fist Award for best karate referee in the United States.

In 1973, Norris founded the National Tang Soo Do Congress (NTC), and named Johnson as executive vice president and chief of instruction. In 1979, Norris disbanded the NTC and formed the United Fighting Arts Federation (UFAF), again naming Johnson as executive vice president.

In 1980, Johnson had a small supporting role in the feature film The Little Dragons (later known as The Karate Kids U.S.A.). In the film, Johnson played the karate instructor to a pair of young brothers (portrayed by Chris and Pat Petersen) who use their martial arts skills to foil a kidnapping plot.

In 1984, Johnson served as Stunt Co-ordinator on The Karate Kid. Johnson also featured in the movie as the chief referee in the All Valley Karate Tournament. He was one of only four cast members who knew any Martial Arts before shooting began.

In 1986, Johnson was promoted to ninth-degree black belt. That same year after a difference of opinion with Norris, he would leave the UFAF and reform the NTC.

Achievements

 1963 Began training in Tang Soo Do Moo Duk Kwan in South Korea under Kang Do Hee.
 1965 Received 1st degree black belt in Tang Soo Do Moo Duk Kwan.
 1968 Began training under Chuck Norris and was made chief of instruction for the Chuck Norris Karate Studios.
 1968 Formulated the penalty point system currently used in karate tournaments.
 1968–1973 Served as captain of the Chuck Norris Black Belt Competition Team, which won 33 consecutive national and international titles.
 1971 Began national Tang Soo Do champion
 1973 Was named vice-president of the National Tang Soo Do Congress, by Chuck Norris.
 1975–1976 Won the Golden Fist Award for the best karate referee in the United States.
 1980 Named as executive vice-president of the United Fighting Arts Federation.
 1984 Served as the stunt coordinator for The Karate Kid.
 1986 Awarded 9th degree black belt by Chuck Norris.
 1986 Due to philosophical reasons left UFAF, and reformed the National Tang Soo Do Congress.
 1989 Served as stunt coordinator for Teenage Mutant Ninja Turtles.
 1993 Inducted into the North American Sport Karate Association (NASKA) Hall of Fame.
 1995 Served as stunt coordinator for Mortal Kombat.
 1996 Inducted into the Black Belt Magazine Black Belt Hall of Fame as Instructor of the Year.

Notes

References

External links
 
 The Karate kid Unofficial Fan Website
 Black Belt Magazine Archives

1939 births
Living people
American choreographers
American male film actors
American male karateka
American tang soo do practitioners
United States Army officers
Sportspeople from Niagara Falls, New York